Duncan Menzies Soutar Simpson  (23 December 1927 - 5 December 2017) was a Scottish pilot, and the former chief test pilot of Hawker Siddeley in the 1970s. He flew the first production Harrier aircraft in December 1967, and the first two-seat Harrier in April 1969.

Early life
He was born in Edinburgh, and was educated at Merchiston Castle School there. His uncle was a test pilot for the Fairey Aviation Company.

Career

de Havilland
After leaving school in 1945 he worked for de Havilland in Hertfordshire.

Royal Air Force
In 1949 he joined the Royal Air Force with 6FTS and 226 OCU, and flew the Gloster Meteor VIII with 222 Squadron. In 1953 he joined the Day Fighter Development Unit at the Central Fighter Establishment.

Hawker Siddeley Aviation

He joined Hawker Siddeley in 1954. He first flew the Hawker Siddeley P.1127 in August 1962; he was the third pilot to fly the P.1127. On 27 December 1967, he was the first the fly the first production Harrier GR1 XV738. On 24 April 1969 he was the first to fly the two-seat Harrier XW174; six weeks later on 4 June 1969 in this aircraft, he was forced to eject at low level (100 ft), over Larkhill in Wiltshire, when the engine failed at 3,000 ft. On ejection from the aircraft he broke his neck; he needed a bone graft, and surgeons had to operate via his throat. He returned to flying nine months later, and received the Queen's Commendation for Valuable Service in the Air in the 1969 Birthday Honours. After this incident, all Hawker aircraft were fitted with canopy severance cord to shatter the canopy before ejection occurred.

He became deputy chief test pilot in 1969. He became chief test pilot in 1970. He was the first to fly the Hawk HS1182 prototype (XX154) at around 7pm on 21 August 1974, and reached 20,000 ft in a 53-minute flight. The Hawk entered service with the RAF in November 1976.

Personal life
He married in June 1958 and had two sons, and a daughter. They lived in Guildford, Surrey.

He received an award in 2011 from the Honourable Company of Air Pilots. He received the OBE in the 1973 Birthday Honours. He became a Fellow of the Society of Experimental Test Pilots. He died aged 89 in December 2017.

See also
 Ralph Hooper, designer of the Harrier and the Hawk
 List of Harrier family losses
 Edward Tennant, first to fly the Folland Gnat on 18 July 1955 from RAF Boscombe Down to RAF Chilbolton in Hampshire

References

External links
 Telegraph obituary 14 December 2017
 Times obituary 10 February 2018

1927 births
2017 deaths
Military personnel from Edinburgh
Royal Air Force personnel
BAE Systems Hawk
De Havilland
Fellows of the Institution of Mechanical Engineers
Fellows of the Royal Aeronautical Society
Harrier Jump Jet
Hawker Siddeley
Officers of the Order of the British Empire
People educated at Merchiston Castle School
People from Edinburgh
People from Guildford
Recipients of the Commendation for Valuable Service in the Air
Royal Air Force officers
Scottish test pilots